Caddick is a surname. Notable people with the surname include:

Andrew Caddick (born 1968), English cricketer
Bill Caddick (born 1944), English musician
Bill Caddick (footballer) (1898–1981), English footballer
Edward Caddick (1931–2017), English actor
Helen Caddick (born 1845), English travel writer
Melissa Caddick (1971–2020), Australian fraudster
Paul Caddick (born 1950), British businessman
Richard Caddick (1740–1819), English Hebraist
William Caddick (1719–1794), English painter

See also
Peter Caddick-Adams (born 1960), British military historian